Julie Grollier is a French physicist working in the field of spintronics.

Education and career  
Grollier studied at the French engineering school Supélec, before doing an internship in the Laboratory of Cristallography and Materials Science at the University of Caen Normandy. She then conducted her doctoral research at École normale supérieure Paris-Saclay under the supervision of Nobel prize laureate Albert Fert, working on magnetization reversal by the injection of spin-current injection. She later joined the University of Groningen in the Netherlands and then the Centre for Nanosciences and Nanotechnologies (formerly known as Institut d'Electronique Fondamentale, in France), as a postdoctoral fellow working on the magnetization dynamics of nano-magnets. She joined a joint research unit between French National Centre for Scientific Research and Thales Group in 2005.

Recognition
Grollier was awarded the CNRS Silver Medal in 2018, and the Irène Joliot-Curie Prize from the French Academy of Sciences in 2021.

In 2015, she was named a Fellow of the American Physical Society (APS), after a nomination from the APS Topical Group on Magnetism and its Applications, "for measurements of spin-transfer torque dynamics and the development of devices to implement biologically inspired computing".

References

External links 
 

French women physicists
Supélec alumni
Living people
Year of birth missing (living people) 
Fellows of the American Physical Society
French nuclear physicists